Rose Philippine Duchesne, RCSJ (August 29, 1769 – November 18, 1852), was a French religious sister and educator whom Pope John Paul II canonized in 1988. She is the only fully canonized female Roman Catholic saint to share a feast day with the Dedication of Saints Peter and Paul on November 18th. A native of France, she immigrated as a missionary to America, and is recognized for her care and education of Indigenous American survivors of the United States Indian removal programs. Along with the founder, Madeleine-Sophie Barat, she was an early member of the Society of the Sacred Heart, and established the congregation's first communities in the United States. She spent the last half of her life teaching and serving the people of the Midwestern United States, which was at that time considered the western frontier of the nation. 

Duchesne was beatified on May 12, 1940, and canonized on July 3, 1988, by the Roman Catholic Church.

Life

Early life
Rose Philippine Duchesne was born in Grenoble, then the capital of the ancient Province of the Dauphiné in the Kingdom of France, the second of seven daughters, along with one son. Her father, Pierre-François Duchesne (1748–1797), was a prominent lawyer during the Day of the Tiles. Her mother, Rose-Euphrosine Périer (1743–1814), was the sister of Claude Périer, an industrialist who later helped finance the rise to power of Napoleon. Pierre-Francois and  Rose-Euphrosine shared her parents' home in Grenoble with her brother, Claude Perier, and his wife – the two young couples living on separate floors. Claude Périer's son, Casimir, later a Prime Minister of France, was the grandfather of Jean Casimir-Perier, a President of France. She was raised in an enormous family home across from the Parliament building or Palace of Justice in Grenoble.

Monastery of the Visitation
After surviving a bout of smallpox which left her slightly scarred, in 1781, Rose Duchesne and her cousin Josephine were sent to be educated in the Monastery of Sainte-Marie-d'en-Haut (known for the social status of its members), located on a mountainside near Grenoble, by the community of Visitandine nuns. When she began to show a strong attraction to the monastic life, her father withdrew her from the monastery school the following year and had her tutored with her cousins in the family home. In 1788 she decided to enter the Visitation of Holy Mary religious order, despite her family's opposition. She convinced an aunt to accompany her on a visit to the monastery, where she immediately requested admission, leaving her aunt to return home without her and to tell her father what happened.

In 1792, however, revolutionaries shut down the monastery during the French Revolution's Reign of Terror and dispersed the nuns. Duchesne returned to her family where she lived at their country home, along with two aunts, who had been Visitandines at Romans-sur-Isère. She attempted to continue living the Rule of Life of her Order while serving her family and those suffering from the Reign of Terror, including those imprisoned at the former monastery.

With the Catholic Church again able to operate openly in France under Napoleon, in 1801, Duchesne attempted to re-establish the Visitation Monastery, acquiring the buildings from its new owner. The buildings were in shambles, having been used as military barracks and a prison. Though a few of the nuns and the mother superior did return temporarily, the nuns found that the austere living conditions were too much for them in their advanced years. Eventually, Duchesne, now the mother superior of the house, was left with only three companions.

Society of the Sacred Heart
While the restored Visitandine community was floundering, in northern France, Madeleine-Sophie Barat founded the new Society of the Sacred Heart—whose members were long known as the "Madames of the Sacred Heart" from their use of that title, due to the hostility to religious communities which lingered in post-Revolutionary France. She wanted to establish a new foundation in Grenoble. Encouraged by her mentor, the Jesuit priest, Joseph Varin, to meet Duchesne in 1804, she traveled there. Duchesne accepted Barat's offer to merge the Visitation community into the Society of the Sacred Heart. The new congregation had a similar religious mission as that of the Visitandines, educating young women, but without being an enclosed religious order. The two women became immediate and lifelong friends.

In 1815, after the end of the Napoleonic Wars, Duchesne followed Barat's instructions and established a Convent of the Sacred Heart in Paris, where she both opened a school and became the Mistress of novices.

Missionary in America
During her childhood, Duchesne had heard many stories in her parish church from missionary priests of life in Louisiana, founded as a colony of New France, and had long felt a desire to serve the Native Americans who lived there. In 1817, William Dubourg, Bishop of the Diocese of Louisiana and the Two Floridas, visited the convent in Paris. Bishop Dubourg was looking for a congregation of educators to help him evangelize the Indian and French children of his diocese. After meeting him, Duchesne, who had never lost her desire to serve as a missionary, begged permission from Barat to serve in the bishop's diocese.

Missouri
In 1818, with Barat's blessing, Duchesne headed out to the United States with four other Sisters of the Society. After ten weeks at sea, they arrived in New Orleans. To their shock, however, the bishop had made no provisions for housing them. After they had rested briefly with the Ursuline nuns, they took advantage of the newly established steamboat service up the Mississippi River to travel to St. Louis, and finally settled in St. Charles, in what was then the Missouri Territory, a journey of seven weeks. She was later to describe the location as "the remotest village in the U.S."; nonetheless the community established a new Sacred Heart convent in a log cabin there, known as the Duquette Mansion, the first house of the Society ever built outside France the first in St. Charles County, Missouri, and the first free school west of the Mississippi. "Poverty and Christian heroism are here", she wrote of the site, "and trials are the riches of priests in this land". The following year Dubourg moved the community across the river to the town of Florissant, Missouri, where they opened a school and a novitiate.

The United States had purchased the area from France only fifteen years earlier, and settlers, many poor but others with money and slaves, were streaming in from the East. Their new foundation faced many struggles, including lack of funds, inadequate housing, hunger, and freezing weather, and the Sisters struggled to learn English. By 1828, the Society's first five members in America had grown to six communities, operating several schools. Other foundations in Louisiana followed: at Grand Coteau, near Opelousas, at Natchitoches, at Baton Rouge, at New Orleans, and at Convent, Louisiana. In 1826 Pope Leo XII, through a decretum laudis, formally approved the Society of the Sacred Heart, recognizing their work. The Jesuits acquired the Sisters' former school property in St. Charles in 1828, where they built a parish church, and asked the Sisters to returnto that same log cabin where they had lived because it was still the biggest house in townand conduct the parish school.

Kansas
In 1841 the Jesuits asked the Sisters to join them in a new mission with the Potawatomi tribe in eastern Kansas, along Sugar Creek, where Christian Hoecken was taking charge. At age seventy-one, she was not among those initially selected for the trip. Peter Verhaegen insisted, "She may not be able to do much work, but she will assure success to the mission by praying for us." Since Duchesne was unable to master their language, she could not teach, so she would spend long periods in prayer. The children named her Quahkahkanumad, which translates as Woman Who Prays Always.<ref name=Callan>Callan R.S.C.J., Louise. in reference to stories told of small trinkets placed on her robes which were still in the same place hours later. Philippine Duchesne: Frontier Missionary of the Sacred Heart", The Newman Press, 1954.</ref> At the request of the Jesuit priest Pierre-Jean De Smet, she continued her work, and helped Native Americans as far as the Rocky Mountains.

Slavery
Like many of this period in American history (see List of slave owners) some of the Sisters in America bought and sold enslaved people, which surprised Duchesne when she arrived, as by that time slavery in France had been outlawed. According to Rachel L. Swarns, writing in the New York Times “In spite of my repugnance for having Negro slaves, we may be obliged to purchase some,” Rose Philippine Duchesne, who established the Society of the Sacred Heart in the United States, wrote in 1822. A year later, the Sacred Heart sisters in Grand Coteau purchased their first person, an enslaved man named Frank Hawkins, for $550." According to the Society of the Sacred Heart, Xavier Murphy also purchased the rest of Mr. Hawkins' family members from their former owners for purposes of family reunification. Upon discovering Duchesne's links to slavery, Digby Stuart College, one of the constituent Colleges of the University of Roehampton which was founded by the Sisters of the Sacred Heart, renamed the Duchesne Building after Nelson Mandela.

Death
In 1842, after a year among the Potawatomi, it was clear that Duchesne's health could not sustain the regime of village life, and she returned to St Charles. She spent the last decade of her life living there in a tiny room under a stairway near the chapel in solitude and prayer. Toward the end of her life, she was alone, going blind, feeble, and yearned for letters from Barat. She wrote, "I live now in solitude and am able to use my time reflecting on the past and preparing for death. I cannot put away the thought of the Indians and in my ambition I fly to the Rockies".  She died on November 18, 1852, aged 83.

Veneration
Initially buried in the convent cemetery, Duchesne's remains were exhumed three years later and intact. She was then reburied in a crypt within a small shrine on the convent grounds. The cause for Duchesne's canonization was introduced in 1895. She was declared Venerable in 1909 by Pope Pius X and was beatified by Pope Pius XII in 1940. The Holy See ordered in 1951 that she be buried more suitably. Construction was begun on a larger shrine, and her remains were moved there on June 13 of the following year.Photos of the Shrine Pope John Paul II canonized her on July 3, 1988.

See also
Roman Catholicism in the United States#American Catholic Servants of God, Venerables, Beatified, and Saints
 Saint Rose Philippine Duchesne, patron saint archive
 Theophile Papin, who delivered to Pope Pius the testimony taken in connection with Duchesne's canonization

References

Bibliography
Catherine M. Mooney, Philippine Duchesne: A Woman with the Poor'' (NY: Paulist Press, 1999; rpt. Wipf & Stock, 2007)

External links
Network of Sacred Heart Schools
International Society of the Sacred Heart
Associated Alumnae and Alumni of the Sacred Heart
Catholic Online – St. Rose Philippine Duchesne

1769 births
1852 deaths
Clergy from Grenoble
18th-century French nuns
Visitandine nuns
French educators
Religious Sisters of the Sacred Heart
French emigrants to the United States
Female Roman Catholic missionaries
French Roman Catholic missionaries
Founders of schools in the United States
Education in St. Charles County, Missouri
19th-century American Roman Catholic nuns
People from St. Charles, Missouri
People from St. Louis County, Missouri
People from Miami County, Kansas
Roman Catholic missionaries in the United States
Beatifications by Pope Pius XII
Canonizations by Pope John Paul II
18th-century Christian saints
19th-century Christian saints
American Roman Catholic saints
French Roman Catholic saints
Incorrupt saints
Christian female saints of the Early Modern era
Christian female saints of the Late Modern era
Catholics from Missouri
Catholics from Kansas
Educators from Missouri
American women educators
19th-century French nuns